Connor Mackey (born September 12, 1996) is an American professional ice hockey defenseman for the Arizona Coyotes of the National Hockey League (NHL). Mackey became highly coveted as an undrafted free agent after playing three years of college ice hockey for Minnesota State University, ultimately signing with the Calgary Flames in March 2020. He is the son of former NHL player David Mackey, who played for the Chicago Blackhawks, Minnesota North Stars, and St. Louis Blues.

Playing career

Amateur
After playing two years of hockey at Barrington High School near his hometown of Tower Lakes, Illinois between 2012 and 2014, serving as team captain in his final year, Mackey spent the 2014–15 hockey season as a member of the triple-A level U18 Team Illinois in the High-Performance Hockey League (HPHL). 

Mackey began playing for the Green Bay Gamblers of the United States Hockey League (USHL) in 2015–16. He was named an alternate captain in 2016–17 and emerged as an offensive engine on a Gamblers squad that also featured future NHL first-round pick Casey Mittelstadt. Mackey led the team with 47 points in 60 games and was named USHL Defenseman of the Year and to the USHL First All-Star Team. He was recruited to join the Minnesota State Mavericks men's ice hockey team to begin the 2017–18 season.

Prior to the start of his college career, Mackey was invited to and attended the Calgary Flames' 2017 summer prospect development camp as an undrafted free agent. Beginning that fall, Mackey enjoyed a successful debut season with the Mavericks which saw him earn a spot on the 2017–18 Western Collegiate Hockey Association (WCHA) All-Rookie Team. In the summer of 2018, Mackey again attended an NHL prospect convention: this time, he was invited to the Buffalo Sabres' annual development camp. He followed it up with a 2018–19 season during which he was named a WCHA All-Academic and to the All-WCHA Third All-Star Team.

In 2019–20, Mackey, unaffiliated with any professional club after going undrafted, emerged as a top prospect and attracted interest from 28 of the NHL's 31 teams. He led Mavericks defensemen with 24 points in 36 games en route to being named to the All-WCHA First All-Star Team and the American Hockey Coaches Association's All-America West Second Team. Mackey's performance in 2019–20 led TSN's Frank Seravalli to name him the top-ranked college free-agent on the market.

Professional
On March 20, 2020, Mackey signed a one-year, entry-level contract with the Calgary Flames to take effect at the start of the 2020–21 NHL season. Despite his contract not taking effect until the following season, Mackey joined the Flames for practices in the Edmonton bubble as part of the return-to-play program in the 2020 Stanley Cup playoffs. Mackey made his NHL debut on February 13, 2021.

During the 2022–23 season, Mackey was remained on the Flames roster, primarily serving as a depth defenseman and healthy scratch. After 10 appearances with the Flames, Mackey was dealt at the NHL trade deadline along with Brett Ritchie to the Arizona Coyotes in exchange for Nick Ritchie and Troy Stecher on March 3, 2023.

Career statistics

Regular season and playoffs

International

Awards and honors

References

External links
 

1996 births
Living people
AHCA Division I men's ice hockey All-Americans
American men's ice hockey defensemen
Arizona Coyotes players
Calgary Flames players
Green Bay Gamblers players
Ice hockey players from Illinois
Minnesota State University, Mankato alumni
Minnesota State Mavericks men's ice hockey players
People from Barrington, Illinois
Stockton Heat players
Undrafted National Hockey League players